The 2021 BGL BNP Paribas Luxembourg Open was a professional women's tennis tournament played on indoor hard courts sponsored by BNP Paribas. It was the 25th edition of the Luxembourg Open, and part of the WTA 250 tournaments category of the 2021 WTA Tour. It was held in Kockelscheuer, Luxembourg from 13 to 19 September 2021.

Champions

Singles

  Clara Tauson def.  Jeļena Ostapenko, 6–3, 4–6, 6–4

Doubles

  Greet Minnen /  Alison Van Uytvanck def.  Erin Routliffe /  Kimberley Zimmermann 6–3, 6–3

Points and prize money

Point distribution

Prize money

1 Qualifiers prize money is also the Round of 32 prize money
* per team

Singles main draw entrants

Seeds

 Rankings are as of August 30, 2021.

Other entrants
The following players received wildcards into the main draw:
  Anna-Lena Friedsam 
  Mandy Minella 
  Stefanie Vögele 

The following players received entry from the qualifying draw:
  Jana Fett 
  Arianne Hartono
  Ekaterina Makarova 
  Jule Niemeier
  Lesia Tsurenko
  Anastasia Zakharova

Withdrawals
Before the tournament
  Clara Burel → replaced by  Océane Dodin
  Andrea Petkovic → replaced by  Astra Sharma
  Kateřina Siniaková → replaced by  Aliaksandra Sasnovich
  Nina Stojanović → replaced by  Clara Tauson

Doubles main draw entrants

Seeds

Rankings are as of August 30, 2021.

Other entrants
The following pairs received wildcards into the doubles main draw:
  Anna-Lena Friedsam /  Lena Papadakis
  Mandy Minella /  Liudmila Samsonova

The following pair received entry using a protected ranking:
  Vitalia Diatchenko /  Yana Sizikova

Withdrawals
Before the tournament
  Mona Barthel /  Kaitlyn Christian → replaced by  Kaitlyn Christian /  Anna Karolína Schmiedlová

References

External links 
 

2021 WTA Tour
2021
2021 in Luxembourgian sport
Luxembourg Open